The Zaza Formation is a geological formation located in Buryatia (Russia). It dates to the Lower Cretaceous period. It is Aptian in age and consists of  sandstones, siltstones, marls and bituminous shales, deposited in a stratified lake. It is situated on a large granite plateau in the NE of Buryatia. The formation is known for its numerous compression fossils of many varieties of insect found predominantly at the Baissa locality, located on the banks of the Vitim River. Insects are found in multiple beds throughout the succession, predominantly in the finer grained facies, the preservation of insect fossils is variable between beds, with good preservation in marl and poor preservation in shale beds.

See also 
 List of fossil sites

References

Further reading 
 

Geologic formations of Russia
Lower Cretaceous Series of Asia
Cretaceous Russia
Aptian Stage
Paleontology in Russia